Puoroyoya is a river in Russia, flowing around Olonetsky District of Karelia. The mouth of the river is 47 km on the left bank of the river Tuloksa. The river is 19 km, the catchment area 134 км².

References

Rivers of the Republic of Karelia